The first of the 1894 Atalanti earthquakes occurred on 20 April 1894 at 16:52 UTC, with a magnitude of 6.4 on the moment magnitude scale and a maximum perceived intensity of X on the Mercalli intensity scale. It was followed seven days later on 27 April at 19:42 UTC by the second, with a magnitude of 6.9 and had a maximum intensity of X. These two earthquakes caused widespread damage in the Locris area, causing a total of 255 deaths. More literature on these destructive events can be seen in the references section.

See also
 List of earthquakes in Greece
 List of historical earthquakes

References

Ganas, A., Roberts, G.P., & Memou, Tz. 1998. Segment boundaries, the 1894 ruptures and strain patterns along the Atalanti Fault, Central Greece. Journal of Geodynamics, 26: 2–4, 461–486.
Ganas, A, Sokos, E, Agalos, A, Leontakianakos, G, Pavlides S, 2006,  Coulomb stress triggering of earthquakes along the Atalanti Fault, central Greece: Two April 1894 M6+ events and stress change patterns. Tectonophysics, 420, 357–369.
Nature, volume 50, 607–607 (18 Oct 1894), doi: 10.1038/050607a0.
Pantosti, D., P. M. De Martini, D. Papanastassiou, F. Lemeille, N. Palyvos and G. Stavrakakis, 2004, Paleoseismological Trenching across the Atalanti Fault (Central Greece): Evidence for the Ancestors of the 1894 Earthquake during the Middle Ages and Roman Times, Bulletin of the Seismological Society of America; v. 94; no. 2; p. 531–549; DOI: 10.1785/0120020207
Papavassiliou, A. (1894a,b). Sur le tremblement de terre de Locride (Grece) du mois d' Avril 1894, C. R. Acad. Sci. Paris 19, 112–114 & 380–381.
Richter, C. F. (1958). Elementary Seismology, Freeman, San Francisco, 768 pp.

Earthquakes in Greece
1894 earthquakes
April 1894 events
1894 in Greece
1894 disasters in Greece